Joel Smith (born 1977) is a former Australian rules footballer for Hawthorn and St Kilda.

Joel Smith may also refer to:

 Joel Smith (footballer, born 1996), Australian rules footballer for Melbourne
 Joel Smith (murderer) (born 1973), English drug dealer and convicted murderer
 Joel B. Smith, American climatologist and expert on climate change policy
 Joel Smith, an actor working with the Screen Directors Playhouse
 Joel Smith, a curler competing in 2013 Molson Coors Tankard
 Joel Smith, an actor in 1965 American film Mutiny in Outer Space

Other uses
 Joel Smith House, a historic house in rural Union County, Arkansas

See also
 Joe Smith (disambiguation)